Hoplosphyrum boreale, known generally as the western bush cricket or long-winged scaly cricket, is a species of scaly cricket in the family Mogoplistidae. It is found in North America.

References

Crickets
Articles created by Qbugbot
Insects described in 1902